In enzymology, a 1-alkylglycerophosphocholine O-acetyltransferase is an enzyme that catalyzes the chemical reaction

acetyl-CoA + 1-alkyl-sn-glycero-3-phosphocholine  CoA + 2-acetyl-1-alkyl-sn-glycero-3-phosphocholine

Thus, the two substrates of this enzyme are acetyl-CoA and 1-alkyl-sn-glycero-3-phosphocholine, whereas its two products are CoA and 2-acetyl-1-alkyl-sn-glycero-3-phosphocholine.

This enzyme belongs to the family of transferases, specifically those acyltransferases transferring groups other than aminoacyl groups.  The systematic name of this enzyme class is acetyl-CoA:1-alkyl-sn-glycero-3-phosphocholine 2-O-acetyltransferase. Other names in common use include acetyl-CoA:1-alkyl-2-lyso-sn-glycero-3-phosphocholine, 2-O-acetyltransferase, acetyl-CoA:lyso-PAF acetyltransferase, 1-alkyl-2-lysolecithin acetyltransferase, acyl-CoA:1-alkyl-sn-glycero-3-phosphocholine acyltransferase, blood platelet-activating factor acetyltransferase, lyso-GPC:acetyl CoA acetyltransferase, lyso-platelet activating factor:acetyl-CoA acetyltransferase, lysoPAF:acetyl CoA acetyltransferase, PAF acetyltransferase, platelet-activating factor acylhydrolase, platelet-activating factor-synthesizing enzyme, 1-alkyl-2-lyso-sn-glycero-3-phosphocholine acetyltransferase, and lyso-platelet-activating factor:acetyl-CoA acetyltransferase.  This enzyme participates in ether lipid metabolism.

References

 

EC 2.3.1
Enzymes of unknown structure